Below is a list of the smallest exoplanets so far discovered, in terms of physical size, ordered by radius. Some of these are unconfirmed and/or controversial.

List

The sizes are listed in units of Earth radii. All planets listed are smaller than Earth, up to 0.7 Earth radii. The NASA Exoplanet Archive is used as the main data source.

See also
 List of largest exoplanets
 List of exoplanet extremes
 Lists of exoplanets

References 

Lists of exoplanets